Mahonia taronensis is a shrub in the family Berberidaceae described as a species in 1923. It is endemic to China, found in  Tibet and Yunnan.

Mahonia taronensis should not be confused with Berberis taronensis (a different species, also native to Yunnan and Tibet).

References

Endemic flora of China
taronensis
Plants described in 1923